The women's pole vault event at the 2017 Summer Universiade was held on 24 and 26 August at the Taipei Stadium.

Medalists

Results

Qualification
Qualification: 4.00 m (Q) or at least 12 best (q) qualified for the final.

Final

References

Pole
2017